The 1981 French Grand Prix was a Formula One motor race held at Dijon on 5 July 1981. It was the eighth race of the 1981 FIA Formula One World Championship.

The 80-lap race was won by Alain Prost, driving a Renault. On home soil, Prost scored the first of an eventual 51 Grand Prix victories, in a race that was stopped after 58 laps due to heavy rain and then restarted, with aggregate times determining the final positions. John Watson finished second in his McLaren-Ford, while Nelson Piquet, who had been leading in his Brabham-Ford when the race was stopped, finished third.

Prior to the race, Jean-Pierre Jabouille decided to retire from Formula One, having not fully recovered from the leg injuries he had sustained in Canada the previous year. His place at Ligier was taken for the rest of the season by Patrick Tambay, who moved from Theodore.

Classification

Qualifying

Race

Championship standings after the race

Drivers' Championship standings

Constructors' Championship standings

References

French Grand Prix
French Grand Prix
Grand Prix